To the Victor is a 1948 drama film directed by Delmer Daves and starring Dennis Morgan and  Viveca Lindfors. The plot concerns an American black-marketeer who falls in love with a Nazi collaborator's wife in post-World War II Paris.

Cast

References

Bibliography
 Bernard F. Dick. The President’s Ladies: Jane Wyman and Nancy Davis. Univ. Press of Mississippi, April 14, 2014.

External links
 
 

1948 films
1948 romantic drama films
American black-and-white films
American romantic drama films
1940s English-language films
Films directed by Delmer Daves
Films scored by David Buttolph
Films set in Paris
Warner Bros. films
1940s American films